The Wood Nymph (subtitled ), Op. 15, is a programmatic tone poem for orchestra composed in 1894 and 1895 by the Finnish composer Jean Sibelius. Organizationally, the tone poem consists of four informal sections, each of which corresponds to one of the poem's four stanzas and evokes the mood of a particular episode: first, heroic vigor; second, frenetic activity; third, sensual love; and fourth, inconsolable grief.

The Wood Nymph was performed three more times that decade, then, at the composer's request, once more in 1936. Never published, the ballade had been thought to be comparable to insubstantial works and juvenilia which Sibelius had suppressed until the Finnish musicologist Kari Kilpeläinen 'rediscovered' the manuscript in the University of Helsinki archives, "[catching] Finland, and the musical world, by surprise". Osmo Vänskä and the Lahti Symphony Orchestra gave the ballade its modern-day 'premiere' on 9 February 1996. Although the score had been effectively 'lost' for sixty years, its thematic material had been known in abridged form via a melodrama for narrator, piano, two horns, and strings. Sibelius probably arranged the melodrama from the tone poem, although he claimed the opposite.

Composition 
Sibelius admired Rydberg and often set his poetry to music, including the melodrama Snöfrid, Op. 29, and the War Song of Tyrtaeus. The poem Skogsrået was first published in 1882, and in 1883 Sibelius's future friend, the artist Akseli Gallen-Kallela, illustrated it. In 1888 or 1889, about the time the two met, Sibelius first set Skogsrået for voice and piano. This setting is musically unrelated to Sibelius's 1894–95 treatment.

In 1894, although Sibelius was a national figure in Finland and had completed major works like Kullervo and the Karelia Suite, he was still struggling to break free of Wagnerian models and develop a truly individual style. The origin of the tone poem remains obscure but The Wood Nymph may well have gradually evolved out of music for a verismo opera that Sibelius had planned but never realized. The libretto, as related in a letter from Sibelius dated 28 July 1894, tells the story of a young, engaged student who, while travelling abroad, meets and is attracted by an exotic dancer. Upon his return, the student describes the dance and dancer so vividly that his fiancée concludes he has been unfaithful; the opera ends with a funeral procession for the student's fiancée (the letter is unclear as to her cause of death). Furthermore, in a letter from 10 August 1894, Sibelius informs his wife, Aino, of a new composition "in the style of a march". Murtomäki argues that Sibelius readily adapted his previous musical ideas to the plot of : the march became Björn's theme from the first section of The Wood Nymph, the protagonist "tak[ing] himself off (abroad)" became the frenetic chase of the second, the unfaithfulness with the dancer became the seduction by the evil skogsrå in the third, and the opera's funeral procession became the despair of Björn in the finale.

While both tone poem and melodrama would emerge from this material, it is not clear which musical form Sibelius initially used to tackle Rydberg's poem. In the 1930s, the composer claimed he had first composed the melodrama (premiered on 9 March 1895 at a lottery ball benefiting the Finnish Theatre where it was narrated by ), only to realize subsequently that "the material would allow a more extensive treatment" as a symphonic poem. Scholars, however, have disputed this chronology, arguing that, given the premiere of the tone poem a mere month later, it is "improbable, if not totally impossible" that Sibelius could have expanded the melodrama so quickly. He probably "compressed" the earlier tone poem, eliminating bridges and repetitions, to produce the streamlined melodrama. The manuscript of the melodrama has far fewer corrections than the manuscript of the tone poem, which supports this view. Sibelius also arranged the conclusion for solo piano.

Performance history 

The tone poem premiered on 17 April 1895, at the Great Hall of the University of Helsinki, with Sibelius himself conducting the Helsinki Orchestral Society; the programme also included the tone poem  (Spring Song) and selections from the Karelia Suite. A repeat performance was given two days later. Despite its positive reception, The Wood Nymph would only be played another five times in Sibelius's lifetime: twice in Turku on 29 and 30 November 1897; twice in Helsinki at the premiere of his Symphony No. 1 on 26 and 30 April 1899 (a highly important event in Sibelius's career, and a sign that he viewed The Wood Nymph as a worthy counterpoint to the symphony); and, after a 37-year hiatus, once in Helsinki on 27 October 1936. Sibelius, who was in his seventies and had retired to Ainola, was not present for this final performance, although he appears to have personally selected The Wood Nymph for the programme; Georg Schnéevoigt, who cut the score extensively in order to fit the performance into the radio broadcast's allotted time, conducted the Helsinki Philharmonic, with President Pehr Evind Svinhufvud, Prime Minister Kyösti Kallio, and Marshal Carl Gustaf Emil Mannerheim in attendance.

After 1936, The Wood Nymph again disappeared from the repertoire. Throughout his career, Sibelius was troubled with creative 'blocks' and bouts of depression. This led him to commit score to the flames when he felt unable to revise them to the level he demanded. This was the fate most notoriously of the Symphony No. 8, but also of many works from the 1880s and 1890s. He did not, however, destroy The Wood Nymph. The ballade lay neglected amongst the more than 10,000 pages of papers and scores which the composer's family had deposited in 1982 at the University of Helsinki Library archive. The work was 'rediscovered' by the manuscript expert Kari Kilpeläinen; its subsequent inspection by Fabian Dahlström "caught Finland, and the musical world, by surprise": the tone poem, 22 minutes in length and scored for full orchestra, was far more than the melodrama "recast without the speaker" many in the Sibelius establishment had assumed it to be. The Wood Nymph received its modern-day 'world premiere' on 9 February 1996 by the Lahti Symphony Orchestra, with Osmo Vänskä conducting. Vänskä had received permission from Sibelius's family to perform the work. Out of necessity, Vänskä supplemented the manuscript—full of edits and, thus, "very difficult to read" in isolation—with notes from the 1936 performance. In 2006, Breitkopf & Härtel published the first edition of The Wood Nymph.

Orchestration 
Woodwind: piccolo, 2 flutes, 2 oboes, 2 clarinets, bass clarinet, 2 bassoons
Brass: 4 horns, 3 trumpets, 3 trombones
Percussion: timpani, triangle, bass drum, cymbals, tambourine
Strings: violins, violas, cellos, double basses

Structure 
In 1893, Sibelius had expressed his belief in the necessity of poetic motivation in music in a letter to the poet , "I believe that music alone, that is absolute music, can not satisfy. It awakens feelings and states of mind but always something unsatisfied remains in our souls..." In a letter to Aino from August 1894, Sibelius claimed to be "really a tone painter and poet" in the mold of the symphonic poems of Liszt. In The Wood Nymph, Sibelius adheres closely to the narrative structure of Rydberg's poem, so much so that at the 1895 premiere, audience members were provided with copies of the source material, indicating the centrality of Rydberg's plot to the performance. Due to its programmatic qualities, musicologists commonly describe The Wood Nymph, although in one movement, as consisting of four informal sections or "dramatic tableaux", each of which corresponds to one of the poem's four stanzas:

 Alla marcia
 Vivace assai—Molto vivace
 Moderato
 Molto lento

First section 
Björn, "a tall and handsome lad", is announced by a heroic brass fanfare. His strength and good looks have aroused "the cunning spirits", and on his way to a feast one summer evening, he is entranced by the "singing" woods. The opening music, "breezy" and triumphant in C major, recalls the Karelia Overture, Op. 10 (not to be confused with the Karelia Suite, Op. 11) which Sibelius had written in 1893, and betrays no sign of Björn's impending fate. Björn's theme is recapitulated at the end of the second section.

Second section 
Björn "willingly but under duress", plunges deep into the magical Nordic forest and is enchanted by evil, mischievous dwarves, who "knit a web of moonbeams" and "hoarsely laugh at their prisoner". Considered by some critics to be the tone poem's most striking section, the "proto-minimalist" music in A minor is at once hypnotic and delightfully propulsive: Sibelius repeats and reworks the same short motif (belonging initially to the clarinets) into a rich woodwind tapestry, quickening the tempo and adding off-beat horns and pulsating trombones, to produce what Murtomäki has described as a "modal-diatonic sound field".

Third section 

Björn encounters and is seduced by a beautiful wood nymph. The sensual, midsummer-night music in C-sharp major is "bathed in an erotic afterglow"; a solo cello cantilena, joined by horn and pizzicato strings, representing the nymph's erotic advances. "Who could resist," Glenda Dawn Goss has written in mock defense, "her [the nymph's] throaty solo cello voice, her sensuously swaying movements, a white limb glimpsed, honey-smooth, beneath a moon-white gown, a sweetly heaving breast?"

Fourth section 
The music mutates from the erotic C-sharp major to a dark and mournful 'funeral march' in C-sharp minor. As the undulating, "aching" violin theme crashes against the brass, Björn is left with "inconsolable grief", obsessed with the memory of the skogsrå. "Hardly ever has music been written," wrote the music critic of the newspaper Uusi Suometar following the 1899 performance, "which would more clearly describe remorse."

Reception 

Although well received upon its premiere, critical opinion as to the merit of The Wood Nymph has varied. Following the 1895 premiere, Oskar Merikanto, writing in Päivälehti, praised Sibelius for having "masterfully" recreated Rydberg's plot with the use of "unique and fascinating colors", while critic Karl Flodin complained in Nya Pressen that it was "unquestionably too long". Modern day opinion has been similarly equivocal. While conceding that The Wood Nymph contains "some splendid melodic ideas" and "luxuriant scoring", Erik Tawaststjerna has characterized the work as the "experiment" of a composer "still trying to find his feet as a tone-poet", suggesting that Sibelius is too dependent on the source material's narrative structure. Murtomäki, though praising the ballade for its "unforced freshness of vision and tonal audacity" and "well elaborated, original and inventive characters", agrees with Tawaststjerna that The Wood Nymph is too episodic in construction:

As a whole,  is not a highly unified organism like Sibelius’s subsequent large orchestral works: the four  legends and the first two symphonies...The formal problem is that the links are, for the most part, missing; Sibelius simply juxtaposes different formal sections without connective elements smoothing over the junctures. In view of his later mastery of the "art of transition," achieved by subtly overlapping different textures and tempos, in  Sibelius is still at the beginning of his development. 

Finnish composer Kalevi Aho's response has been similar, calling the ballade "an interesting work" in need of "more polishing". Finnish conductor Osmo Vänskä, however, has championed the ballad. "It's a tremendous piece," Vänskä has said in interview. "He [Sibelius] never managed to revise it, but nothing is wrong with the music. Sibelius never forbade performance of The Wood Nymph." Stylistically, scholars have detected in The Wood Nymph the influence of Richard Wagner. Murtomäki, for example, discerns the "erotic harmonic vocabulary" of Tristan und Isolde in the third section and the "motive of the forbidden question" from Lohengrin in the funereal march from the finale. In light of Sibelius's "Nietzschean response" to Wagner's operas (initially enamored, Sibelius by July 1894 had repudiated Wagner's ideas as "calculated" and "manufactured"), such observations are of particular interest in that they illustrate the extent to which Sibelius, at the time of The Wood Nymph, had not yet succeeded in breaking with the German master.

Analysis

Autobiographical details 
A few musicologists have speculated that The Wood Nymph is potentially autobiographical. "The strong autobiographical element in Skogsrået is unmistakable", Murtomäki has written, adding that in the ballade, "Sibelius probably confesses an affair to Aino". For Murtomäki, the balladic nature of The Wood Nymph is key, as in the genre "it was expected that the singer/storyteller/composer should reveal himself". At the time, it was common for the first sexual partners of men of Sibelius's class to be prostitutes. Murtomäki says that "In their concealed or "unofficial" sexual life, they experienced a certain type of female sexual adventurousness that their wives could not easily match." He hypothesizes that The Wood Nymph and other contemporaneous compositions were Sibelius's method of dealing with the emotional consequences of this and his guilt towards his wife Aino.

With its focus on sexual fantasy, The Wood Nymph differs sharply from the Rydberg poem Snöfrid which Sibelius set in 1900. In , Gunnar, the patriotic hero, resists a water nymph's sensuous "embrace" to instead "fight the hopeless fight" for his country and "die nameless". The contrast between Björn and Gunnar, Murtomäki argues, reflects Sibelius's own personal transformation: crowned a "national hero" following the 1899 premiere of the Symphony No. 1, Sibelius wished to demonstrate that he had "outgrown his early adventurism" and learned to place country before "libertine" excess. Murtomäki's conclusion, however, is not universally accepted. David Fanning, in his review of the edited volume in which Murtomäki's essay appears, has savaged as "dubious" and "tendentious" such autobiographical speculations. Per Fanning: "For Murtomäki every half-diminished chord seems to be a Tristan chord, with all the symbolic baggage that entails...Such half-baked hermeneutics baffle and alienate...enthusiasm has occasionally been allowed to run riot".

Lack of publication 
Why Sibelius should have failed to prepare The Wood Nymph for publication is a question that has perplexed scholars. On the advice of Ferruccio Busoni, Sibelius in 1895 offered The Wood Nymph to the Russian music publisher Mitrofan Belyayev but it was not published. Murtomäki has suggested that Sibelius, despite having been fond of The Wood Nymph, was "unsure about the true value" of his output from the 1890s, an ambivalence that is perhaps best illustrated by the piecemeal publication history of, and multiple revisions to, the four Lemminkäinen legends (appearing in the composer's 1911 diary under a list of works to be rewritten, The Wood Nymph, too, seems to have been scheduled by Sibelius for a reexamination, albeit one that never came to pass). Scholars have offered a number of explanations as to why Sibelius may have "turned his back" on his early compositions. Perhaps, as master, he looked back on the works of his youth as technically "inferior" to his mature output; or, as evolving artist, he sought distance from passionate, nationalistic exclamations as he developed his own, unique musical style and aimed to transition from "local hero" to "international composer"; or, as elder statesman, he feared he might have "revealed himself too much" in early "confessional" works, such as En saga, Lemminkäinen and the Maidens of the Island, and The Wood Nymph. In the absence of any new information from Sibelius's papers, however, the reason why The Wood Nymph was never published ultimately "appears doomed to remain a subject of speculation".

Discography 
Even after the wave of publicity that followed its reemergence, The Wood Nymph remains rarely recorded compared to other early Sibelius works. It received its world premiere in 1996 under the BIS label with Osmo Vänskä leading the Lahti Symphony Orchestra. Some musical material was unavailable until the publication of the Breitkopf & Härtel JSW critical edition in 2006 and was thus not included on prior recordings. The 1888 version for voice and piano has been recorded by Anne Sofie von Otter. Erik Tawaststjerna also recorded the piano solo version together with the rest of Sibelius's piano transcriptions. The 1996 Vänskä recording also included the first recording of the melodrama, narrated by Lasse Pöysti.

Notes

References

Bibliography 

 

 

Symphonic poems by Jean Sibelius
1894 compositions
1895 compositions